Hutchison Telecommunications Hong Kong Holdings Limited is a telecommunications operator in Hong Kong. It operates GSM dual-band, 3G, 4G LTE mobile  services in Hong Kong and Macau  under the licensed global Three brand. It launched a 5G service in Hong Kong on 1 April 2020 and is flourishing into a digital operator in the new 5G era. 

It was listed on the Stock Exchange of Hong Kong on 8 May 2009 by way of introduction from the spin-off of Hutchison Telecommunications International.  It is now a subsidiary of CK Hutchison Holdings.

In October 2017, Hutchison Telecommunications Hong Kong Holdings Limited disposed of its fixed-line subsidiary Hutchison Global Communications (HGC) to Asia Cube Global Communications Limited for HK$14.5 billion ($1.86 billion US) to focus on mobile business.

Business 
 3 Hong Kong
 3 Macau

References

External links
 

Telecommunications companies of Hong Kong
CK Hutchison Holdings
Telecommunications companies established in 2009
2009 establishments in Hong Kong
Companies listed on the Hong Kong Stock Exchange